Mariscala is a small town in the Lavalleja Department of southeastern Uruguay.

Geography

History
Its status was elevated to "Pueblo" (village) category on 1 February 1918 by decree Ley Nº 5.639 and on 27 June 1988 to "Villa" (town) by decree Ley Nº 15.960.

Population
In 2011 Mariscala had a population of 1,626.
 
Source: Instituto Nacional de Estadística de Uruguay

Places of worship
 Our Lady of Pompei Parish Church (Roman Catholic)

References

External links
INE map of Mariscala

Populated places in the Lavalleja Department